Toblerone is a Swiss chocolate brand produced in Bern, Switzerland, sometimes manufactured elsewhere in the past, and planned to be made in Slovakia from the end of 2023. Toblerone is known for its distinctive shape, a series of joined triangular prisms and lettering engraved in the chocolate.

The company was independent from 1899 until 1970, then merged with Suchard, then with Jacobs as Jacobs Suchard, then acquired by Kraft Foods, then by Mondelez International in 2012.

History 

The Tobler chocolate factory was founded in 1899 by Emil Baumann & Theodor Tobler (1876–1941) in Bern. In 1908, Emil Baumann, the cousin of Theodor Tobler, created the unique recipe consisting of milk chocolate including nougat, almonds, and honey. Theodor Tobler came up with the distinctive triangular shape and packaging. The product's name is a portmanteau combining Tobler's name with the Italian word torrone (a type of nougat).

The triangular shape of the Matterhorn in the Swiss Alps/Italian Alps is commonly believed to have given Theodor Tobler his inspiration for the shape of Toblerone. However, according to Theodor's sons, the triangular shape originates from a pyramid shape that dancers at the Folies Bergères created as the finale of a show that Theodor saw. Another source of inspiration could have been the similar triangular packaging of the Delta Peter brand. Nevertheless, a silhouette of the Matterhorn appears on the modern Toblerone packaging, as seen in the photo above right. An outline of a bear, the symbol of Bern, is also depicted on the mountain on the packaging.

Some early advertisements for Tobler chocolate appeared in the international languages Esperanto and Ido.

Theodor Tobler applied for a patent for the Toblerone manufacturing process in Bern in 1909. The Toblerone brand was trademarked in 1909, at the Swiss Federal Institute of Intellectual Property in Bern.

The Tobler company was independent for many years. In 1970, it merged with Suchard, the makers of Milka, to become Interfood. After the Tobler & Suchard merger it was decided to create a new and single source for marketing & exporting the various products manufactured by both companies worldwide, Multifood.  Max E. Baumann, the son of Emil Baumann, was made director of this new division. Tobler & Suchard companies merged with the Jacobs coffee company in 1982 to create Jacobs Tobler & Suchard. Kraft Foods Inc acquired the majority of Jacobs Suchard, including Toblerone, in 1990; in 2012, it was spun off (alongside several other brands) to Mondelēz.

Sizes and variants 
Bar sizes range from ten centimetres to nearly one metre, all similarly proportioned. According to Schott's Food & Drink Miscellany the sizes and number of peaks for Toblerones are as follows:

For the yearly Toblerone Schoggifest, a special oversized bar is created to celebrate the bar's anniversary. The bar's weight represents the years of Toblerone, with the first bar in 2008 weighing 100 kg.

Since the 1970s, other variants of Toblerone have been produced. These include:

 Plain chocolate in a yellow triangular box (1969)
 Dark chocolate in a black triangular box
 White chocolate In a white triangular box (1973)
 Milk chocolate Mint Crisp In a white/green triangular box (1985)
 Snowtop Editions with white chocolate peaks, also in a white/silver triangular box
 Filled editions Milk chocolate with a white chocolate centre (blue triangular box)
 OneByOne Individually wrapped triangular chunks
 Toblerone Pralines Released in 1997, a single peaked version in the distinctive beige packaging
 Fruit & Nut In 2007 with a half purple triangular cardboard box
 Honeycomb crisp With a half white box with honeycomb pieces pictured on it (2009)
 Crunchy Salted Almond With honey and almond nougat and salted caramelised almonds
 Berner Bär 500g milk chocolate bar, with a relief portrait of the Bernese Bear and the Coat of arms of Bern on its face. The only non-triangular Toblerone.
 Toblerone Tobelle Toblerone thins in a beige triangular box:
 Crispy Coconut With honey and almond nougat and coconut
 Golden Caramel Caramel with honey and almond nougat
 Tobler Truffles Introduced 2022

2016 size changes
In 2016, the 400g and 170g bars in the United Kingdom were modified to have two peaks removed and larger gaps between the peaks, which reduced the cost of making the bars by cutting the weight by about 10%, to 360g and 150g, while retaining the same package size and retail price. Other sizes were unaffected. The change was not well received, with one MSP calling for "government action" by the Scottish Parliament over the change.  In 2018 the bar reverted to its original shape, and the 170g/150g bar was replaced by a 200g bar.

Manufacturing
In the past it was manufactured in other locations including Bedford in England, and Dundee in Scotland from the 1930s up to 1969. In the 1970s and 1980s, it was manufactured under licence in Yugoslavia by Kraš in Zagreb (now in Croatia). 

Producer Mondelez planned to start additional limited production from the end of 2023 in a Slovak factory (known formerly as Figaro) in Bratislava. Swiss rules introduced in 2017 mandate that indicators of Swiss provenance such as packaging stating "Swiss" and showing images typical of Switzerland may not be used, so the bars will be labelled "created in Switzerland", and the image of the Swiss Matterhorn will be replaced by a "modernised and streamlined mountain logo that aligns with the geometric and triangular aesthetic".

Similar products
A similar product is the Croatian product Kolumbo, made by factory Kraš from Zagreb. This chocolate is also composed of pyramids of hazelnuts and honey. Kraš was producing Toblerone under licence during the 1970s and 1980s.

Another comparable product is Mahony, produced by the company Chocolat-Frey AG in Switzerland.

In July 2017, in response to Toblerone's 2016 reduction in size, UK variety store chain Poundland launched its own version of Toblerone called "Twin Peaks", which is larger than the modified Toblerone bar.

Cultural impact 

The distinct pyramidal shape of the bar lent its name to the Toblerone line, a series of anti-tank emplacements from World War two era, prevalent in Switzerland's border areas.

The interior of the Tobler factory in Switzerland was the location where the title sequence of Willy Wonka & the Chocolate Factory was filmed. However, the majority of the film was produced in West Germany.

UK comedy character Alan Partridge battled a longstanding addiction to Toblerones, which became a running gag of his TV series.

In 1995, it was revealed that the Swedish politician Mona Sahlin had misused her government-issued credit card for unauthorised purchases. Because she had bought, among many other more expensive items, two bars of Toblerone, pro-Sahlin journalists attempted to downplay her abuse of parliamentary financial privileges as the "Toblerone affair", but Sahlin was nevertheless forced to step down as a Prime Ministerial candidate. She returned to politics in 1998.

A triangular set of residences for students of the University of Manchester on the Oxford Road, Manchester, England, built in about 1975 are known as the Toblerones.

The largest-sized Toblerone in production is used as a running gag in the 2017 Netflix series Neo Yokio.

See also
 List of references to the Matterhorn

References

Bibliography
 Schott, Ben (2003). Schott's Food & Drink Miscellany. London: Bloomsbury

External links

 

Mondelez International brands
Brand name chocolate
Chocolate bars
Almonds
Swiss confectionery
Swiss chocolate
1990 mergers and acquisitions